Harvest Gold is an Indian food company, headquartered in New Delhi, that produces bread and its associated products.  In 2017, Grupo Bimbo, Mexico's largest food and Bakery Company, bought controlling stakes in Harvest Gold.

History
Harvest Gold was founded in 1993 by Adil Hassan, a chemical engineer from IIT Delhi, along with his wife, and Director, Taab Siddiqui, MBA alumni of Aligarh Muslim University. The first plant was set up by Hassan with an initial investment of Rs 1 crore in Bhiwadi, Rajasthan in June 1993 and was named Harvest gold foods India Pvt Ltd.

See also
Bonn Group of Industries
Grupo Bimbo

External links

References

Companies based in New Delhi
Bakeries of India
Food and drink companies of India
Indian companies established in 1993
1993 establishments in Delhi
Grupo Bimbo subsidiaries
Indian subsidiaries of foreign companies
Food and drink companies established in 1983